Sheikh Kamal (5 August 1949 – 15 August 1975) was the eldest son of Sheikh Mujibur Rahman, former President of Bangladesh and the younger brother of Sheikh Hasina, the current Prime Minister of Bangladesh.

Early life and education
Kamal completed his matriculation from Shaheen School, Dhaka (currently BAF Shaheen College Dhaka) in 1967 and Higher Secondary Certificate Examination from Dhaka College in 1969. He was the General Secretary of the Chatro League in Dhaka College. He practiced sitar at Chhayanaut, a school of music. At the same time, he was involved in diverse cultural activities and a keen sportsman. Kamal was an organizer of the Mukti Bahini guerrilla struggle in 1971. Kamal received wartime commission in Bangladesh Army during the Liberation War of Bangladesh.

Kamal worked as the Aide-De-Camp (ADC) of General Osmani the Commander-in-Chief of the Mukti Bahini, during the Liberation War of Bangladesh. After independence, he left the military at the rank of Captain to return to Dhaka University from where he graduated with Honours in sociology. Days before his tragic demise on 15 August 1975 Kamal completed his master's degree in sociology from Dhaka University . He liked an athlete, Sultana Khuki, who was the first female blue of Dhaka University. On 14 July 1975, the couple got married with the consent of the two family. He was perceived to be the successor to Sheikh Mujib.

Kamal, an avid sportsman, founded the Abahani Limited Dhaka in 1972, a popular sporting club of Bangladesh. He enjoyed football, volleyball, and other sports. Abahani went on to win many local championships and is now considered one of the most well known football clubs in South Asia.

Death

Kamal was brutally killed with the rest of his family, except Sheikh Hasina and Sheikh Rehana on 15 August 1975.

Legacy

Controversy

1973 shootout 
Near the end of 1973 Sheikh Kamal was involved in a shootout in which he was inflicted with bullet injuries. Multiple claims have been made as to how the shootout occurred.
However, a retired major general of the Bangladesh Army claimed that it was a case of friendly fire. Near the end of 1973, Bangladeshi security forces received intelligence that the left-wing revolutionary activist Siraj Sikder and his insurgents were going to launch coordinated attacks around Dhaka. Police and other security officers were on full alert and patrolling the streets of Dhaka in plainclothes. Sheikh Kamal and his friends were armed and also patrolling the city in a microbus looking for Siraj Sikder. When the microbus was in Dhanmondi the police mistook Sheikh Kamal and his friends to be insurgents and opened fire on them, thus injuring Sheikh Kamal. However, it is also claimed that Sheikh Kamal and his friends were in Dhanmondi to test drive a new car that his friend Iqbal Hasan Mahmud Tuku had bought recently. Since Dhaka was under heavy police patrolling, police special forces under the command of the then city SP Mahamuddin Bir Bikrom opened fire on the car thinking that the passengers were miscreants.

Abduction of Major Dalim 
Sheikh Kamal is also accused of abducting Nimmi Dalim and her husband Shariful Haque Dalim (who later assassinated Sheikh Kamal and his family) from the Dhaka Ladies Club and taking them to the Jatiya Rakkhi Bahini headquarters. Gazi Golam Mostafa and his two sons were also accused of being involved in this abduction. This was one of the reasons that Shariful Haque Dalim held a grudge against the Sheikh family. However, it is also alleged that Sheikh Kamal was uninvolved in this incident and Gazi Golam Mostafa along with his sons acted alone in the abduction. It is claimed that Sheikh Mujibur Rahman personally ordered for Dalim and his wife to be released and mediated a compromise between the concerned parties.

Namesakes 
 Sheikh Kamal International Cricket Stadium Academy Ground in Cox's Bazar, Bangladesh was named after him.
 Shaheed Sheikh Kamal Bridge on the Andharmanik River in also named after him.
Sheikh Kamal Stadium, Nilphamari is also named after him on 12 November 2017

References

Awami League politicians
Sheikh Mujibur Rahman family
Place of birth missing
1949 births
1975 deaths
Recipients of the Independence Day Award
Assassination of Sheikh Mujibur Rahman
Dhaka College alumni
Mukti Bahini personnel
Recipients of the Bangladesh National Sports Award
Children of national leaders